Michael Ridley may refer to:
 Michael Ridley (writer), English author, archaeologist and orientalist
 Michael Ridley (cricketer) (born 1947), English cricketer
 Michael Kershaw Ridley (born 1937), Clerk of the Council of the Duchy of Lancaster 
 Mike Ridley (born 1963), Canadian ice hockey player